Henry Okwudili Onwuzuruike (born 26 December 1979) is a Nigerian former professional footballer who played as a midfielder.

Career
Onwuzuruike began his early career in his native Nigeria with NEPA Lagos and Jasper United, before playing in the Netherlands with Heerenveen. He later played in Germany for SpVgg Greuther Fürth, 1. SC Feucht, FC Rot-Weiß Erfurt, TSV Crailsheim and SSV Ulm 1846.

He also represented Nigeria at international level, and played at the 2000 Summer Olympics.

References

1979 births
Living people
People from Aba, Abia
Nigerian footballers
Olympic footballers of Nigeria
Nigeria international footballers
Footballers at the 2000 Summer Olympics
NEPA Lagos players
Jasper United F.C. players
Association football midfielders
SC Heerenveen players
SV Darmstadt 98 players
SpVgg Greuther Fürth players
FC Rot-Weiß Erfurt players
SSV Ulm 1846 players
Eredivisie players
2. Bundesliga players
3. Liga players
Nigerian expatriate footballers
Nigerian expatriate sportspeople in Germany
Expatriate footballers in Germany
Nigerian expatriate sportspeople in the Netherlands
Expatriate footballers in the Netherlands